Sancourt may refer to the following communes in France:

Sancourt, Eure, in the Eure département 
Sancourt, Nord, in the Nord département
Sancourt, Somme, in the Somme département